Zupus may refer to:

Giovanni Battista Zupi, Italian astronomer, mathematician, and Jesuit priest
Zupu, Chinese clan register
 Zupus (crater), the lava-flooded remains of a lunar impact crater on a southwestern reach of the Oceanus Procellarum